This is a directory of properties and districts listed on the National Register of Historic Places in Utah, USA. There are more than 1,800 listed properties in Utah. Each of the 29 counties in Utah has at least two listings on the National Register.

Current listings by county
The following are approximate tallies of current listings in Utah on the National Register of Historic Places. These counts are based on entries in the National Register Information Database as of April 24, 2008 and new weekly listings posted since then on the National Register of Historic Places web site. There are frequent additions to the listings and occasional delistings, and the counts here are not official. Also, the counts in this table exclude boundary increase and decrease listings which modify the area covered by an existing property or district and which carry a separate National Register reference number.

See also

 List of National Historic Landmarks in Utah
 List of bridges on the National Register of Historic Places in Utah

Notes

References

External links

 
Utah